IMPS or Imps may refer to:

 Imps*, a comedy film released in 2009*
 Immediate Payment Service, instant payment inter-bank electronic funds transfer system in India
 OMA Instant Messaging and Presence Service
 Infinite Monkey Protocol Suite, an April Fools' Day RFC
 The Oxford Imps, an improvisational comedy troupe

 Insensitive munition propulsion system

See also
 IMP (disambiguation)